The 2022 BWF World Championships (officially known as the TotalEnergies BWF World Championships 2022 for sponsorship reasons) was a badminton tournament which was held from 22 to 28 August 2022 at Tokyo Metropolitan Gymnasium in Tokyo, Japan.

Host city selection
Tokyo was awarded the event in November 2018 during the announcement of 18 major badminton event hosts from 2019 to 2025.

Medal summary

Medal table

Medalists

Players

Number of participants

Players participating in two events and more

Performance by nation

 Some players/pairs started in the second round as a result of receiving a bye in the first round.

References

External links
Official website

 
BWF World Championships
International sports competitions hosted by Japan
Badminton tournaments in Japan
Sports competitions in Tokyo
BWF World Championships
BWF World
BWF